{{DISPLAYTITLE:Polar T3 syndrome}}
Polar T3 syndrome is a condition found in polar explorers, caused by a decrease in levels of the thyroid hormone T3. Its effects include forgetfulness, cognitive impairment and mood disturbances. It can exhibit itself in a fugue state known as the Antarctic stare.

It is regarded as one of the contributory causes of winter-over syndrome.

See also
 Antarctica: A Year on Ice

References 

Polar exploration
Thyroid disease
Syndromes